Tutukaka is a locality on the east coast of Northland, New Zealand, in an area commonly referred to as the Tutukaka Coast which includes Ngunguru and Matapouri. The city of Whangarei is to the southwest. The residential areas of Tutukaka fringe the hills surrounding Tutukaka Harbour, which has a history as a local fishing port and hosts Tutukaka's marina. The Māori name comes from the term tūtū kākā, which means a parrot (kākā) snaring tree (tūtū).

As the closest marina to the Poor Knights Islands, Tutukaka is the base for boat tours for diving and snorkelling in the waters around these  islands, a protected marine reserve.  At the peak of the busy summer months, Tutukaka's population swells from around 600 permanent residents to over 2,400. A walking track leads from Tutukaka to a small lighthouse at Tutukaka Head (South Gable).

Demographics
Statistics New Zealand describes Tutukaka as a rural settlement. The settlement is part of the larger Matapouri-Tutukaka statistical area.

Tutukaka had a population of 726 at the 2018 New Zealand census, an increase of 138 people (23.5%) since the 2013 census, and an increase of 207 people (39.9%) since the 2006 census. There were 294 households, comprising 357 males and 372 females, giving a sex ratio of 0.96 males per female, with 90 people (12.4%) aged under 15 years, 75 (10.3%) aged 15 to 29, 336 (46.3%) aged 30 to 64, and 219 (30.2%) aged 65 or older.

Ethnicities were 92.6% European/Pākehā, 14.0% Māori, 1.7% Pacific peoples, 1.7% Asian, and 2.1% other ethnicities. People may identify with more than one ethnicity.

Although some people chose not to answer the census's question about religious affiliation, 59.1% had no religion, 32.6% were Christian and 1.7% had other religions.

Of those at least 15 years old, 174 (27.4%) people had a bachelor's or higher degree, and 75 (11.8%) people had no formal qualifications. 132 people (20.8%) earned over $70,000 compared to 17.2% nationally. The employment status of those at least 15 was that 276 (43.4%) people were employed full-time, 108 (17.0%) were part-time, and 15 (2.4%) were unemployed.

References

Whangarei District
Populated places in the Northland Region